Lord Alfred Douglas was a writer.

Alfred Douglas may also refer to:

Alfred Douglas (cricketer) (1872–1938), Australian cricketer
Alfred Douglas (footballer) (1899–?), English football winger

See also

Alfred Douglas-Hamilton